The history of the Mozilla Application Suite began with the release of the source code of the Netscape suite as an open source project. Going through years of hard work (with the help of the community contributors), Mozilla 1.0 was eventually released on June 5, 2002. Its backend code base, most notably the Gecko layout engine, has become the foundation of a number of applications based on Mozilla, including the Mozilla Foundation's flagship product Mozilla Firefox and Mozilla Thunderbird. While the suite is no longer a formal Mozilla product, its development and maintenance is continued as the SeaMonkey community project.

Open sourcing of Communicator
In March 1998, Netscape Communications Corporation released most of the code base for its popular Netscape Communicator suite under an open source license. The name of the application developed from this would be Mozilla, coordinated by the newly created Mozilla Organization, at the mozilla.org website.

The open source release, which came at the height of the United States's late-1990s economic boom, was greeted by the Internet community with a mixture of acclaim and skepticism. In some circles, Netscape's source release was seen as both a victory for the free software movement and an opportunity for Netscape to tap the power of open source development. This view was particularly popular among users of Linux and other free software. Other observers, including many outside of the free software business community, interpreted the move as Netscape's surrender in the face of the ascendancy of Microsoft's Internet Explorer browser.

Regardless of the public's opinion, development with the Communicator code base proved harder than initially hoped:
The Communicator code base was huge and complex.
It had to be developed simultaneously on many operating systems, and therefore to cope with their differing APIs, GUIs, libraries and idiosyncrasies.
It bore the scars of many rapid cycles of closed-source development on "Internet time". The short development cycles had led programmers to sacrifice modularity and elegance in the scramble to implement more features.
Several parts of Communicator's code were never released as open source, due to licensing arrangements with third parties.

Rewriting from scratch

Ultimately, the Mozilla core developers concluded that the old code could not be salvaged. As stated on the October 26, 1998 development roadmap, it was decided to scrap the whole code base and rewrite it from the ground up. The resulting plan included, among other things, the creation of a whole new cross-platform user interface library and a new layout engine.

Few observers foresaw the result. On December 7, 1998, Netscape released a special "preview" based on the Gecko layout engine. Gecko had already been in development for some time at Netscape under the internal name NGLayout (short for "Next Generation Layout"). It was noticeably faster and smaller than its predecessor (known as Mariner). One widely publicized feature of the first Gecko preview release was that it fit on a single 1.44 MB floppy disk, making it about one tenth the size of most contemporary browsers.

The prompt release of Gecko led many to believe that a complete browser could not be far behind. However, the first release of the layout engine was far from bug- and crash-free, and even farther from being ready for the prime-time. Producing a fully functional web browser required much more than the nascent rendering engine: the Mozilla developers soon envisioned a project more ambitious than a simple web browser. The new Mozilla (internally codenamed "Seamonkey") would be a platform for Internet applications, with a fully programmable user interface and a modular architecture.  This Mozilla would function equally well as a host for email client, instant messaging client, news client, or any number of other applications.

Due to the effort required for this massive rewrite, the project fell far behind its original projected deadlines.  In the years that followed, skepticism about Mozilla grew widespread, and some doubted that a finished Mozilla browser would ever see the light of day. However, the project persisted, continuing uninterrupted through both the purchase of Netscape by AOL and the end of the dot-com boom.

By June 5, 2002, the Mozilla project had produced version 1.0 of the browser that worked on multiple operating systems, including Linux, Mac OS, Microsoft Windows, and Solaris. The browser was praised for introducing new features that Internet Explorer lacked, including better support for user privacy preferences and some interface improvements. Additionally, the Mozilla browser became a de facto reference implementation for various World Wide Web Consortium standards, due to its strong support for those standards.

Independence from AOL
On July 15, 2003, AOL announced that it would close down its browser division, which was in essence Netscape's Mozilla. AOL laid off most of Netscape's employees and hackers, except for some who were transferred to other divisions. Netscape signs were seen being pulled off its building, confirming what many took as the end of Netscape. AOL kept the Netscape brand for its portal, but the company no longer paid anyone to develop the Mozilla codebase.

On the same day, the Mozilla Foundation was created. The Foundation is a non-profit organization composed primarily of developers and staff from Mozilla Organization and owns the Mozilla trademark (but not the copyright to the source code, which is retained by the individual and corporate contributors, but licensed under the GPL, MPL and LGPL). It received initial $2 million donations from AOL, IBM, Sun Microsystems, and Red Hat, and $300,000 from Mitch Kapor.

Many people had been expecting this after AOL reached a settlement with competitor, Microsoft, with a deal for the AOL software to use Internet Explorer for the next 7 years. Netscape had always been seen as a bargaining chip for AOL against Microsoft.

The end of the Suite
According to the Mozilla development roadmap published on April 2, 2003, the Mozilla Organization planned to focus development efforts on the new standalone applications: Phoenix (now known as Mozilla Firefox) and Minotaur (now known as Mozilla Thunderbird). Since then, many new features and enhancements have been added to the standalone applications only.

On March 10, 2005, the Mozilla Foundation announced that they would not release any further official versions of the suite beyond 1.7.x. However, the foundation emphasized that they would still provide infrastructure for community members who wished to continue development. In effect, this means that the suite will still continue to be developed, but not by the Mozilla Foundation itself. To avoid confusing organizations that still want to use the original Mozilla Suite, the new product needed a new name. On July 2, 2005, it was announced that the suite is going to be named SeaMonkey, which was originally the code name of the Mozilla Application Suite. The new project-leading group is known as the "SeaMonkey Council".

Branding and visual identity

Initially, the term "Mozilla" was loosely used to refer to a number of subjects, including the Mozilla project, the Mozilla Suite, the codebase of the Suite and its related technologies. Since the shifting of development focus, to distinguish the suite from the standalone products, the suite was marketed as "Mozilla Suite", or the more lengthy "Mozilla Application Suite".

It is often argued that since free software is typically only designed by programmers rather than graphic designers or usability gurus, it frequently suffers from poor icon and GUI design, and a lack of a strong visual identity.

During development of Mozilla, a number of logos were used in various areas of the application. The logos are inconsistent with each other; for example, the logo used as the program's icon is different from the one used as the throbber, which is again different from the one used in the "About" window.

Release history
Parts of this table are based on the release notes of Mozilla.

Note (1): 1.2.1 was the last official Mozilla.org public release to support Mac OS 9 "Classic". Technically though, 1.3a was the last version to support OS 9 but only via the use of the CarbonLib extension as explained in the 1.3a release notes. An unofficial port of 1.3a was later created in the form of WaMCom in an attempt to provide a stable build of 1.3 for OS 9 users.

Note (2): There was no Mozilla 1.7.4. The 1.7.5 version number was selected to match the internal Gecko version number of Mozilla Firefox 1.0.

Note (3): Mozilla 1.7.9 was cancelled. It was intended that Mozilla 1.7.9 would be released shortly after Mozilla Firefox 1.0.5 and Mozilla Thunderbird 1.0.5. However, regressions were found in the 1.0.5 versions of Firefox and Thunderbird after they were released, so Mozilla 1.7.9 was cancelled. Mozilla 1.7.10 was released shortly after Firefox 1.0.6 and Thunderbird 1.0.6.

Screenshot gallery
The following screenshots show the evolution of user interface in Mozilla from M3 to 1.0. The interface of Mozilla was almost unchanged since version 1.0. Mozilla M11 is not available because of program crash.

See also

History of Firefox
History of free and open-source software
History of Mozilla Thunderbird
Mozilla Application Suite
SeaMonkey

References

External links
Netscape Communications Corporation (April 1, 1999). Netscape celebrates first anniversary of open source software release to mozilla.org. Retrieved June 12, 2005.
Mozilla 1.x Releases
Branding Mozilla: Towards Mozilla 2.0
A Visual Browser History

Mozilla Application Suite
History of the Internet
Mozilla Application Suite
Mozilla Application Suite